Pseudobabylonella minima is a species of sea snail, a marine gastropod mollusk in the family Cancellariidae, the nutmeg snails.

Description
The size of the small, fusiform shell varies between 5 mm and 9 mm. It has a  white to pale brown color. The paucispiral protoconch has an elaborate sculpture that is different from the teleoconch. This teleoconch has up to five whorls with broad round, spiral ridges (between 2 and 11), crossed by 8 to 14 rounded, axial ribs. The sutures are deeply impressed. The aperture is elongately ovoid with only a faint siphonal canal. The thin outer lip has no inner lirae. The umbilicus is closed or sometimes with a narrow slit.

Distribution
This species is found along Southwest Spain, Gibraltar, the Azores, the Canaries, Madeira (very common), Morocco, the Western Sahara and Mauritania.

References

External links
 

Pseudobabylonella
Gastropods described in 1856
Molluscs of the Atlantic Ocean
Molluscs of Madeira
Molluscs of the Canary Islands